Nicola Loda (born 27 July 1971) is an Italian former racing cyclist.

Major results

1989
2nd Overall Tour du Pays de Vaud
1993
1st Trofeo Città di Castelfidardo
3rd GP Industria Artigianato e Commercio Carnaghese
1996
8th GP Ouest-France
1997
3rd Luk-Cup Bühl
5th Overall Tour de Langkawi
7th Coppa Bernocchi
1998
7th Overall Tirreno–Adriatico
8th Luk-Cup Bühl
1999
3rd Overall Regio-Tour
5th Coppa Bernocchi
5th Tour de Berne
7th Overall 4 Jours de Dunkerque
8th Overall Danmark Rundt
1st Stage 3
2000
1st Dekra Open
1st Stage 2 GP du Midi-Libre
3rd Overall Tour de Luxembourg
1st Stage 2
5th Coppa Bernocchi
2002
1st Stage 1 Giro della Liguria
2003
1st Stage 2 Tour de Luxembourg
2004
10th G.P. Costa degli Etruschi

External links

1971 births
Living people
Italian male cyclists
Cyclists from Brescia